Sandarkan (also Romanized as Sandarkān, Sanderkān, Sendarkān, and Senderkān; also known as Sand Zakān) is a village in Dorud Rural District, in the Central District of Dorud County, Lorestan Province, Iran. At the 2006 census, its population was 412, in 85 families.

References 

Towns and villages in Dorud County